The African fat-tailed gecko or fat-tail gecko (Hemitheconyx caudicinctus) is a ground-dwelling species of gecko from West Africa and Cameroon.

Description 

The African fat-tailed gecko is from the subfamily Eublepharinae. This subfamily has clearly different characteristics from other geckos. They are terrestrial, and have moveable eyelids, vertical pupils, and no adhesive lamellae.

The African fat-tailed gecko is typically around 7–8 inches, with females being slightly smaller than males. Normal coloring is brown and tan/beige stripes, with a possible thin white stripe along the length of the back. The underbelly is pale pink or off-white.

Distribution and Habitat 
The African fat-tailed gecko is found in West Africa, from Senegal to Nigeria, extending marginally to Central Africa (northern Cameroon). Within their range, these geckos are found in the dry Sahel habitat, as well as in wet or dry savannah habitat. African fat-tailed geckos will spend most of their time in a dark, humid hiding place such as a termite mound. 

African fat-tailed geckos have been seen to vary in physical attributes based on their habitat even within specific regions of Africa from size, scale pattern, to color. This allows for them to be able to fend off predators and be successful at repopulating.

Behavior 
The African fat-tailed gecko is equipped with the ability to lose its tail when threatened or attacked. If the tail is lost, the new tail will have a more rounded shape, similar to the head. It may not match the body coloration and pattern of the gecko. The tail is also where they store their fat, an important energy reserve. With its tail, an African fat tailed gecko can go days on end without food.

African fat-tailed geckos are reportedly strictly nocturnal, taking shelter from their generally hot and dry environment during the day and emerging at night to forage. They have been found during the day hiding under a variety of cover and will retreat to burrows or hide under rocks or fallen logs.

Diet 
African fat-tailed geckos have a primarily insectivorous diet, feeding on various kinds of insects and other invertebrates within their habitats, such as worms, crickets, possibly beetles or cockroaches, etc.

African fat-tailed geckos as pets 
In the pet trade the African fat-tailed gecko has gained some popularity though is still not as popular as the closely-related leopard gecko. With good care, African fat-tailed geckos generally live 15-20 years, although longer may be possible.

Through selective breeding the reptile trade has been able to produce numerous color variants of the African fat-tailed gecko including tangerine, albino, patternless, black out, and aberrant.

References

External links
Caring for an African fat-tailed gecko
African fat-tailed gecko breeding
African fat-tailed gecko gallery

Hemitheconyx
Geckos of Africa
Reptiles of Cameroon
Reptiles of Nigeria
Reptiles of West Africa
Taxa named by André Marie Constant Duméril
Reptiles described in 1851